Winter Child is the first studio album of American singer-songwriter Matt Duke.  It was released by the student-run record label Mad Dragon in the US on September 12, 2006, and distributed by Ryko Distribution.

History
After the production of Mad Dragon's first compilation album, XYX, which featured Duke, Mad Dragon asked Duke sign a deal to produce a full-length album.  Production for the album began thereafter and continued for the next year and a half. The original producer of the album was Jim Klein, a professor and director of the Mad Dragon program, but disagreements during production lead Duke to switch production to Stewart Lerman and Steuart Smith at the Shinebox Studio in New York. A student-produced music video was made for the song "Oysters" and the audio CD was released as an enhanced CD that featured an electronic press kit.

Theme and lyrical content
Winter Child uses literary inspirations as a basis for some songs.  The title track is a reference to the Ernest Hemingway short story Hills Like White Elephants and the song "Listen To Your Window" takes inspiration from John Banville.

Track listing
All songs written by Matt Duke.

Personnel

Musicians
 Matt Duke – Vocal, acoustics, electrics, keyboards, percussion, piano
 Steuart Smith – Acoustics, electrics, keyboards, harmonica, percussion, bass, vocals
 Stewart Lerman – Percussion, acoustics
 Steve Holley – Drums, percussion
 Rob Morsberger – String arrangements, keyboards, accordion
 David Mansfield – Violin, viola
 Debbie Assael – Cello
 Andrew Keenan – Pedal steel
 Jim Klein – Piano on "Nausea," producer on "When the Bough Breaks"
 Gretchen Witt – Vocals on "Ballroom Dancing"

Production
 Stewart Lerman – Production (Tracks 1, 2, 3, 4, 5, 6, 7, 8, 9, 10, 11), mixer
 Steuart Smith – Production (Tracks 1, 3, 4, 6, 7, 8, 9, 11)
 Jim Klein – Production (Tracks 2, 5, 10, 12)
 Greg Calbi – Mastering
 Michael Pierce – Artwork concept and design
 Matt Duke – Illustrations
 Stephanie Pistel – Photography

External links

References

2006 albums
Albums produced by Stewart Lerman